Someone to Watch Over Me is a Philippine television drama romance series broadcast by GMA Network. Directed by Maryo J. de los Reyes, it stars Tom Rodriguez, Lovi Poe and Max Collins. It premiered on September 5, 2016 on the network's Telebabad line up replacing Juan Happy Love Story. The series concluded on January 6, 2017 with a total of 90 episodes. It was replaced by Meant to Be in its timeslot.

The series is streaming online on YouTube.

Premise
TJ falls in love with Joanna. He and his wife faces their biggest setback when he is diagnosed with Early-onset Alzheimer's disease.

Cast and characters

Lead cast
 Tom Rodriguez as Teodoro Jose "TJ" Agustin Chavez
 Lovi Poe as Joanna Mercado-Chavez

Supporting cast
 Max Collins as Irene Montenegro-Fernando
 Edu Manzano as Gregor "Buddy" Chavez
 Jackie Lou Blanco as Cielo Andrada-Chavez
 Ronnie Lazaro as Ruben "Estoy" Mercado
 Isay Alvarez-Seña as Remedios "Cita" Mercado
 Boy 2 Quizon as Paolo 
 Frances Makil-Ignacio as Cecilia "Cess" Navarro
 Ralph Noriega as Jefferson "Jepoy" Mercado

Recurring cast
 Luz Valdez as Rose Montenegro
 Shyr Valdez as Osang
 Camille Torres as Eunice
 Maricris Garcia-Cruz as Monique
 Espie Salvador as Espie
 Caleb Punzalan as Joshua Chavez
 Cogie Domingo as Adrian "Ian" Alejandro

Guest cast
 Melissa Mendez as Adora Agustin
 Johnny Revilla as Irene's father
 Lui Manansala as Gracia
 Mikael Daez as Dave Fernando
 Lance Serrano as Alex
 Eugene Runas as Tope
 Dido De La Paz as Robert
 Aleera Montalla as Lulu

Ratings
According to AGB Nielsen Philippines' Mega Manila household television ratings, the pilot episode of Someone to Watch Over Me earned a 17.3% rating. While the final episode scored a 17.1% rating in Nationwide Urban Television Audience Measurement.

Accolades

References

External links
 
 

2016 Philippine television series debuts
2017 Philippine television series endings
Filipino-language television shows
GMA Network drama series
Philippine romance television series
Television shows set in the Philippines